is a Japanese publishing executive and former manga magazine editor, who is currently serving as an advisor to Hakusensha. He formerly worked at Shueisha, where he began as an editor in 1976, before becoming a senior managing director (CEO), and later a Shogakukan-Shueisha Productions director. When he moved to Hakusensha in 2015, he first served as president, then representative director, before taking on his current role of advisor.

Torishima is often associated with works from the manga magazine Weekly Shōnen Jump, for which he was editor-in-chief from 1996 to 2001. He was manga author Akira Toriyama's editor during the run of Dr. Slump and through the first half of Dragon Ball. Torishima received a Special Achievement Award at the 2022 Japan Media Arts Festival for his work in manga, including the discovering of Toriyama and establishing the now "indispensable cross-media production method".

Career
Although Torishima grew up in Niigata Prefecture, he did not like the people there as they had nothing in common to talk about, so he spent his youth alone reading books. He said that because he could not get into a university, he moved to Tokyo to enter a prep school, where he was liberated having found people that were smarter than himself and shared his interests.

Torishima joined Shueisha in 1976, the year he graduated from Keio University, wanting to work on Monthly Playboy because of their high-quality short stories. However, he was assigned as an editor at Weekly Shōnen Jump, despite having never really had any contact with manga until Shueisha sent him their products for reference, and put in charge of Doberman Deka. After this series jumped from around thirteenth in the reader rankings to third and going to the Shogakukan archives to study classic manga, Torishima finally became interested in his job. Preferring shōjo manga such as Kaze to Ki no Uta and Poe no Ichizoku, he felt that Jump manga at the time "had no intelligence or depth" and decided to help foster manga he found interesting as long as they ranked high with readers. He also studied the first chapter of Ore wa Teppei panel by panel and the layout and angles in each one, because he felt it was the easiest manga to read and tried to impart this basic structure to his artists. Torishima was most notably editor to Akira Toriyama during Dr. Slump (1980) and the beginning of Dragon Ball (1984), and to Masakazu Katsura during Wingman (1983).

Torishima is a fan of video games and was therefore put in charge of the first video game-related articles in Weekly Shōnen Jump, for which he brought in Yuji Horii to help. When his manager told him to figure out why CoroCoro Comic was doing so well, Torishima determined it was because of the sealed pages that had to be cut opened and included cheats and tips for video games. In addition to including similar pages in Jump, they also began to rate games, something new at the time, with the resulting content being voted third in the magazine's reader polls. After finding success with video game articles and wanting to show readers of Jump how one is developed, the magazine decided to develop their own role-playing game like Ultima so that they would have exclusive coverage of it. He decided to have Horii, who had begun working at Enix, write the scenario and Toriyama design the characters. Torishima claimed that he purposefully had Enix fully fund the game, intentionally keeping Shueisha out of the decision making process for the good of the product while still reserving the option to create a manga based on it and not pay any royalties. The video game was Dragon Quest.

Torishima was editor-in-chief of the video game-themed V Jump when it launched in 1993. In February 1996, he took over as editor-in-chief of Weekly Shōnen Jump during declining sales. While circulation continued to decline, blockbuster series such as Yu-Gi-Oh!, One Piece, and Naruto were launched. He was the magazine's editor-in-chief until June 2001.

He became a member of the board of directors at Shueisha and was appointed full-time Director of Business in August 2004. He served during the establishment of Shogakukan-Shueisha Productions in 2008. Torishima became a managing director (CEO) at Shueisha in August 2009 and promoted to Senior Managing Director in August 2010. In December 2010, he spoke at the New Manga Creators Awards in response to the Tokyo Metropolitan Ordinance Regarding the Healthy Development of Youths's controversial passing of the industry opposed Bill 156. There he challenged new manga artists to "produce manga that would blow away [Tokyo Governor] Shintaro Ishihara."

Torishima retired from Shueisha in August 2015 and became president of Hakusensha in November 2015. His term as president was set for two and a half years. In November 2018, Torishima was promoted to Representative Director. As of 2022, he was working as an advisor to Hakusensha.

He was a member of the Tokyo Organising Committee of the Olympic and Paralympic Games' Mascot Selection Panel, who determined the process for choosing the mascots of the 2020 Summer Olympics. The panel decided to allow children a hand in the selection of the mascot for the first time at an Olympic Games. Torishima said, "Kids' minds work differently from adults'. As a member of the panel, I like to think my job is to help bridge that gap."

Influence on fiction
In 2016, Torishima claimed that when he became a deputy editor at Weekly Shōnen Jump he created teaching materials for how the editors should help their manga artists that are still used to this day.

As a rookie editor, Torishima was put in charge of Doberman Deka, which had already been chosen to end in a few months due to low rankings in the reader surveys. Believing that its artist Shinji Hiramatsu was good at action but bad at drawing women, Torishima gave him an issue of the actor and idol magazine Myojo and told him to model the face of a new policewoman character after that of the most popular idol at the time, Ikue Sakakibara. After which, Doberman Deka jumped from around thirteenth in the reader rankings to third, and made Torishima finally interested in his job.

Torishima convinced Toriyama to make Arale the main character of Dr. Slump instead of Senbei Norimaki, which the author agrees turned out better. Toriyama stated that Torishima enjoys romance and that the relationships of Arale and Obotchaman, Akane and Tsukutsun, and Taro and Tsururin in Dr. Slump were all his ideas. He also stated that when starting Dragon Ball, Torishima had wanted Goku and Bulma to form a relationship. Toriyama also created the Dragon Ball character Cell after Torishima, no longer his editor, was disappointed with Androids 19 and 20, and later Androids 17 and 18, as villains.

Masakazu Katsura credits Torishima with coming up with ideas for Video Girl Ai. It was Torishima who brought Tetsuo Hara the offer from Capcom to create the character designs for the video game Saturday Night Slam Masters.

Torishima has been parodied often in many manga series serialized in Weekly Shōnen Jump. The most notable being the character Dr. Mashirito in Toriyama's Dr. Slump, who serves as the series' most prominent antagonist and has the same name as the editor but with the syllables reversed. He also inspired other manga characters such as Matoriv in Dragon Quest: Dai no Daibōken, Torishiman in Tottemo! Luckyman, and the character King Bonbi in the board game Momotaro Dentetsu.

Direct parodies of Torishima appear in Kinnikuman written by the duo Yudetamago and Bakuman by Tsugumi Ohba and Takeshi Obata.

References

External links
 

1952 births
Japanese chief executives
Japanese magazine editors
Keio University alumni
Living people
People from Niigata Prefecture
Manga industry
Comic book editors